Arno Rutte  (born 24 April 1972 in Hengelo) is a Dutch politician. As a member of the People's Party for Freedom and Democracy (Volkspartij voor Vrijheid en Democratie) he has been an MP since 20 September 2012. Previously he was a member of the municipal council of Groningen from 2010 to 2012. 
He is also the singer of the band 'Hairy Harry & The Ladyshavers'.

In August 2019 he announced he was going to leave the House of Representatives.

He is unrelated to Prime Minister and Party Leader Mark Rutte.

References

External links
  Parlement.com biography

1972 births
Living people
Members of the House of Representatives (Netherlands)
Municipal councillors of Groningen (city)
Politicians from Groningen (city)
People from Hengelo
People's Party for Freedom and Democracy politicians
21st-century Dutch politicians